Schönenberg-Kübelberg is a former Verbandsgemeinde ("collective municipality") in the district of Kusel, Rhineland-Palatinate, Germany. On 1 January 2017 it merged into the new Verbandsgemeinde Oberes Glantal. The seat of the Verbandsgemeinde was in Schönenberg-Kübelberg.

The Verbandsgemeinde Schönenberg-Kübelberg consisted of the following Ortsgemeinden ("local municipalities"):

 Altenkirchen
 Brücken
 Dittweiler
 Frohnhofen
 Gries
 Ohmbach
 Schönenberg-Kübelberg

Former Verbandsgemeinden in Rhineland-Palatinate